Ibón de Estanés is a lake in the Province of Huesca, northeastern Spain.

References

Estanes
Geography of the Province of Huesca